Inger Elisabeth Prebensen (born 11 January 1945) is a Norwegian jurist and banker.

She was born in Oslo. She has been director of the Norwegian Guarantee Institute for Export Credits, Kjøbmandsbanken, and Norges Postsparebank. She later had leading positions in the International Monetary Fund.

References

1945 births
Living people
Businesspeople from Oslo
Norwegian bankers